Anthony Rossomando (born 21 February 1976) is an Oscar, Grammy, and Golden Globe-winning songwriter.

Rossomando, along with Carl Barât, was a founding member of Dirty Pretty Things. He previously stood in for Pete Doherty in The Libertines as a touring member. He has also been a live member of British New Rave band Klaxons. 

Rossomando's songs are represented by Concord Music Group.

Life and career
Anthony grew up in Hamden, Connecticut.

After dropping out of university in his first year he relocated to Boston where The Damn Personals were born. Shortly after, The Damn Personals became a mainstay at popular Boston, Providence, and New York indie venues. They also toured Europe and UK once with Cave In.

In 2003, introduced by Isaac Green of Columbia records, Rossomando met Carl Barât in New York City and agreed to fill in for Doherty in an upcoming US tour for The Libertines; this was followed by a trip to London to play Top of the Pops and Reading and Leeds festival. Eight months later he rejoined The Libertines to help support the entire worldwide touring campaign for their self-titled second album. It was during this time when Rossomando and Barât began to formulate their ideas that would later embody Dirty Pretty Things. 

In May 2006, Dirty Pretty Things released Waterloo To Anywhere which reached no. 3 in the UK charts, while the first single "Bang Bang You're Dead" peaked at no. 4. The band toured extensively in the UK, US, Europe and Japan.

Anthony also played trumpet on:

 Chisel - "Set You Free"
 Piebald - "We Are the Only Friends We Have" 
 The Cribs - "The New Fellas"

The Rime of the Modern Mariner, Anthony's first film score, premiered at the East London Film Festival in May 2011 with live orchestral arrangement which also went to several festivals including Latitude, SXSW, and Toronto. The film and score received high praise from many publications including the Times and the Guardian.

In November 2007, he played the role of Pete Neon in the first episode of the third series of The Mighty Boosh.

In 2018, Anthony co-wrote the song "Shallow" with Lady Gaga, Mark Ronson, and Andrew Wyatt. It was produced by Gaga with Benjamin Rice. "Shallow" is a song for the 2018 film A Star Is Born, performed by Lady Gaga and Bradley Cooper. It is the first single from the film's soundtrack and was released on September 27, 2018, by Interscope Records. "Shallow" was nominated for and won Best Original Song – Feature Film at the 2018 Hollywood Music in Media Awards. It also received a nomination in the category of Best Original Song at the 23rd Satellite Awards, and from the Los Angeles Online Film Critics Society. It won the award for Best Original Song at the 76th Golden Globe Awards and the Academy Award for Best Original Song at the 91st Academy Awards in 2019.

Rossomando also penned the song for Disney's version of Jack London's book The Call of the Wild which starred Harrison Ford.

Discography

Soundtrack appearances
 The Rime of the Modern Mariner (2010)

As producer
 Accidental Happiness - EP (2014) – Ida Maria
 Big Things (2010) – Fiction
 Parakeets (2010) – Fiction

Other appearances and songwriting discography

References

American punk rock guitarists
American rock guitarists
American male guitarists
People from Hamden, Connecticut
1976 births
Golden Globe Award-winning musicians
Grammy Award winners
Living people
Sony Music Publishing artists
The Libertines members
Dirty Pretty Things (band) members
21st-century American guitarists
21st-century American male musicians
Best Original Song Academy Award-winning songwriters
The Chavs members